James Octavius Whelan Jr. (September 19, 1936 – April 18, 2018) was a Republican member of the Pennsylvania House of Representatives. He is a native of Petersburg, Virginia.

He was first elected May 21, 1974. He died in 2018 in Atlanta, Georgia.

References

1936 births
2018 deaths
Republican Party members of the Pennsylvania House of Representatives
Politicians from Petersburg, Virginia